Clément Daniel Maxime Penhoat (born November 26, 1992 in Chevreuse), better known by his stage name Hatik, is a French rapper and actor from Guyancourt, Yvelines.

He was known by his musical project Chaise pliante starting 2018. His biggest hit to date is "Angela". In 2020 he obtained a leading role of Apash in the French TV series Validé broadcast on Canal+.

Discography

Albums / Mixtapes

EPs
2017: Par le pire
2019: Projet Berlin (with Daymolition) (Low Wood)

Singles

Featured in

Other songs

*Did not appear in the official Belgian Ultratop 50 charts, but rather in the bubbling under Ultratip charts.

Filmography
2020: Validé as Clément / Apash (TV series)

References

External links
Facebook

French rappers
French male actors
1992 births
Living people
French people of French Guianan descent
People from Yvelines